Met 1 is a residential skyscraper located in the Metropolitan Miami complex in the central business district of Downtown Miami, Florida, United States.

Met 1 was the first building to be completed in the complex. It is a residential building, designed to supplement the much larger Met 3 tower, of which it is similar architecturally.

The Metropolitan Miami project has gained attention due to NBA star Shaquille O'Neal's involvement in the project. He formed the O'Neal Group, a building-development company. The Metropolitan Miami project is the group's first.

Gallery

See also
Metropolitan Miami (development)
Met 2 Marriott Marquis
Wells Fargo Center (Miami)
Met 3
List of tallest buildings in Miami

External links 
Met 1 on Emporis

Residential buildings completed in 2007
Residential skyscrapers in Miami
Residential condominiums in Miami
2007 establishments in Florida